Tuz SC is an Iraqi football team based in Tuz Khurmatu, Saladin Governorate. Tuz has the largest Turkmen community in Saladin Province. Tuz is a word of Turkish origin which means "salt".

2012–13
Currently Tuz is runner-up in the 2012–13 Iraq Division 1 Group A and in their way to qualify to the Iraq Premier League.

External links
 Club page on Goalzz

1990 establishments in Iraq
Association football clubs established in 1990
Football clubs in Kirkuk